The 2014 Seoul mayoral election was held on 4 June 2014 as part of the 6th local elections.

Selection of candidates

Saenuri Party

New Politics Alliance for Democracy

Unified Progressive Party

Final candidates

Results

Summary

By districts

References 

Seoul mayoral elections
Seoul mayoral election
Seoul mayoral election